Comfort Woman Statue may refer to one of the following statues:

Statue of Peace, a statue in South Korea
Filipina Comfort Women, a statue that was erected in Manila, Philippines
San Francisco Comfort Women Memorial, a statue installed in San Francisco, U.S.